This is a list of prime ministers of New Zealand by place of birth. Of New Zealand's forty-one prime ministers, nineteen were born in New Zealand, nineteen in the United Kingdom (including one in what is now the Republic of Ireland, but was then part of the United Kingdom of Great Britain and Ireland), two in Australia, and one in Portugal. Of those born in New Zealand, eleven were born in the North Island, and eight in the South Island. All prime ministers in office since 1960 have been born in New Zealand.

Australia (2)
 Joseph Ward – Melbourne, Victoria
 Michael Joseph Savage – Tatong, Victoria

New Zealand (19)

North Island (11)
 John Key – Auckland
 David Lange – Auckland
 Robert Muldoon – Auckland
 Jacinda Ardern – Hamilton, Waikato
 Helen Clark – Hamilton, Waikato
 Chris Hipkins – Hutt Valley, Wellington
 Gordon Coates – Kaipara Harbour
 Jim Bolger – Ōpunake, Taranaki
 Keith Holyoake – Mangamutu, Manawatū
 Jack Marshall – Wellington
 Mike Moore – Whakatāne, Bay of Plenty

South Island (8)
 Bill English – Lumsden, Southland
 Francis Bell – Nelson
 Geoffrey Palmer – Nelson
 George Forbes – Lyttelton, Canterbury
 Jenny Shipley – Gore, Southland
 Sidney Holland – Greendale, Canterbury
 Norman Kirk – Waimate, Canterbury
 Bill Rowling – Motueka, Tasman Region

Portugal (1)
 George Grey – Lisbon

United Kingdom (19)

England (12)
 Frederick Whitaker – Bampton, Oxfordshire
 Frederick Weld – Bridport, Dorset
 Harry Atkinson – Broxton, Cheshire
 Alfred Domett – Camberwell, Surrey
 Richard Seddon – Eccleston, Lancashire
 William Hall-Jones – Folkestone, Kent
 Walter Nash – Kidderminster, Worcestershire
 John Hall – Kingston upon Hull, Yorkshire
 Julius Vogel – London
 Henry Sewell – Newport, Isle of Wight
 George Waterhouse – Penzance, Cornwall
 William Fox – South Shields, County Durham

Ireland (3)
 Daniel Pollen – Dublin, Leinster (now the Republic of Ireland)
 John Ballance – Glenavy, Ulster
 William Massey – Limavady, Ulster

Scotland (4)
 Thomas Mackenzie – Edinburgh
 Edward Stafford – Edinburgh
 Robert Stout – Lerwick, Shetland Islands
 Peter Fraser – Tain, Ross and Cromarty

See also
 Immigration to New Zealand
 List of prime ministers of New Zealand
 List of prime ministers of New Zealand by age

Place of birth
Prime
Birthplaces
Lists of prime ministers by place of birth